I'm Going to Break Your Heart is a Canadian documentary film, directed by Annie Bradley and Jim Morrison and released in 2019. The film profiles musicians Raine Maida and Chantal Kreviazuk on a retreat in St. Pierre and Miquelon, detailing both their collaboration on the joint album Moon vs. Sun and their efforts to work on the fractures and conflicts that had emerged in their 19 years of marriage.

The film had select theatrical screenings before premiering on Crave in May 2019.

Reviewing the film for The Georgia Straight, Ken Eisner opined that while Maida and Kreviazuk appeared to have been attempting to make a version of Once, the 2007 drama film starring Glen Hansard and Markéta Irglová, the film instead played like a marginally more hopeful version of The Swell Season, the later documentary film about the dissolution of Hansard and Irglová's marriage.

The film received a Canadian Screen Award nomination for Best Biography or Arts Documentary Program or Series at the 8th Canadian Screen Awards in 2020.

References

External links

2019 films
Canadian documentary films
Documentary films about pop music and musicians
Documentary films about rock music and musicians
Canadian musical films
2010s English-language films
2010s Canadian films